The Egypt men's national squash team represents Egypt in international squash team competitions, and is governed by the Egyptian Squash Association.

Since 1969, Egypt has won 5 World Squash Team Open titles. Their most recent title came in 2019.

Current team
 Ali Farag
 Tarek Momen
 Karim Abdel Gawad
 Mohamed Abouelghar

Results

World Team Squash Championships

See also 
 Squash in Egypt
 Egyptian Squash Association
 World Team Squash Championships
 Egypt women's national squash team

References 

Squash teams
Men's national squash teams
Squash
Squash in Egypt
Men's sport in Egypt